The Mersey-class cruiser was a class of second class protected cruiser of the Royal Navy commissioned in the late 1880s.

Design

Ships

Notes

References

External links

 

Cruiser classes
 
Ship classes of the Royal Navy